Cheryl St. John is a best-selling author of romance fiction, located in Omaha, Nebraska.

Biography
Cheryl St. John is a romance author primarily known for her books through Harlequin and Silhouette.  Rain Shadow, her first book, was nominated for the Romance Writers of America’s RITA Award, Romantic Times Best Western Historical, and Affaire de Coeurs Best American Historical Romance.

In 2005 St. John's novel His Secondhand Wife earned another RITA Award nomination.  Many of St.John's Special Editions have made Waldenbooks Top Ten. Land of Dreams, The Magnificent Seven, and Prairie Wife have won Romantic Timess Reviewers Choice Awards. Her anthology, Big Sky Brides, reached #35 on The New York Times list.

Works

Novels 

Cowboy Creek Christmas
Want Ad Wedding
Sequins and Spurs
Her Montana Man
Her Colorado Man
Marrying the Preacher's Daughter
 The Preacher's Wife, Love Inspired Historical, 2009
 The Preacher's Daughter, Harlequin Historical, June 2007
 The Lawman's Bride, Harlequin Historical, February 2007
 The Bounty Hunter, Harlequin Historical, September 2005
 His Secondhand Wife, Harlequin Historical, July 2005
 Million-Dollar Makeover, Silhouette Montana Mavericks, June 2005
 Prairie Wife, Harlequin Historical, February 2005
 Child of Her Heart, Silhouette Logan's Legacy, December 2004
 The Tenderfoot Bride, Harlequin Historical, November 2003
 Marry Me...Again, Silhouette Montana Mavericks, August 2003
 Nick All Night, Silhouette Special Edition, June 2002
 The Gunslinger's Bride, Harlequin Historical Montana Mavericks, September 2001
 The Magnificent Seven, Silhouette Montana Mavericks, March 2001
 Sweet Annie, Harlequin Historical, February 2001
 The Doctor's Wife, Harlequin Historical, October 1999
 Joe's Wife, Harlequin Historical, April 1999
 For This Week I Thee Wed, Harlequin Duets, July 1999
 The Mistaken Widow, Harlequin Historical, September 1998
 The Truth About Toby, Silhouette Special Edition, September 1997
 A Husband By Any Other Name, Silhouette Special Edition, December 1996
 Badlands Bride, Harlequin Historical, July 1996
 Saint or Sinner, Harlequin Historical, October 1995
 Land of Dreams, Harlequin Historical, April 1995
 Heaven Can Wait, Harlequin Historical, October 1994
 Rain Shadow, Harlequin Historical, March 1994

Novellas 
 "A Baby Blue Christmas" in The Magic Of Christmas, Harlequin Historical, 2008
 "A Family For Christmas" in A Western Winter Wonderland, Harlequin Historical, 2007
 "Almost A Bride" in Wed Under Western Skies, Harlequin Historical, 2006
 "Colorado Wife" in Christmas Gold, Harlequin Historical, 2002
 "Isabelle" in Big Sky Brides, Harlequin Historical, 2000

Series/related titles

Neubauer Brothers in Pennsylvania
 Heaven Can Wait
 Rain Shadow

Harvey Girls in Newton, Kansas
 The Doctor's Wife
 The Tenderfoot Bride
 The Lawman's Bride

Copper Creek, Colorado
 Sweet Annie
 His Secondhand Wife
 "Almost A Bride" in Wed Under Western Skies

References

External links 
 Cheryl St.John Official Website
 Cheryl's Blog
 Cheryl's My Space
  Petticoats & Pistols

20th-century American novelists
21st-century American novelists
American romantic fiction writers
American women novelists
Living people
20th-century American women writers
21st-century American women writers
Year of birth missing (living people)